Kanstein may refer to:

Hills:
 the highest hill in the Thüster Berg, Germany
 a hill in the Harz Foreland near Langelsheim, Germany

People:

 Paul Ernst Kanstein (1899–1980/81), German lawyer, Gestapo official and SS-Führer